Idioglossa triumphalis is a species of moth of the  family Batrachedridae. It is known from Mozambique.

References

Endemic fauna of Mozambique
Batrachedridae
Lepidoptera of Mozambique
Moths of Sub-Saharan Africa
Moths described in 1918